Charles Benedict may refer to:
Charles Benedict (sport shooter) (1867–1952), American sport shooter who competed in the 1908 Summer Olympics
Charles B. Benedict (1828–1901), U.S. Representative from New York 31st District, 1877–79
Charles L. Benedict (1824–1901), American lawyer, assemblyman, and judge
Chuck Benedict (born 1946), American Democratic politician from Wisconsin

See also
Charles Benedict Davenport (1866–1944), prominent American eugenicist and biologist
Charles Benedict Calvert (1808–1864), American politician from Maryland
Charles Benedict Driscoll (1885–1951), American editor